Gerzele is a village in the Merkezefendi District of Denizli Province in Turkey.

References

Merkezefendi District